The 2020–21 FKF Premier League (referred to as the BetKing Premier League for sponsorship reasons) was the 18th season of Kenyan Premier League since it began in 2003, and the 58th season of top-division football in Kenya since 1963.

Team Changes 
The following teams have changed division since the 2019–20 season.

To Premier League

Promoted from Super League 

 Nairobi City Stars
 Vihiga United F.C.

From Premier League

Relegated from Premier League 

 Kisumu All Stars
 Chemelil

Expelled from the KPL 

 Sony Sugar

Stadiums

Personnel and sponsoring

Managerial changes

League table

Results

Season statistics

Top scorers

Hat-tricks

Notes 
4 Player scored 4 goals

Clean sheets

References 

Kenyan Premier League seasons
2020 in Kenyan football
2021 in Kenyan football
Kenya